The women's K-2 500 metres sprint canoeing event at the 2020 Summer Olympics took place on 2 and 3 August 2021 at the Sea Forest Waterway. At least 20 canoeists (10 boats of 2) from at least 9 nations competed.

Background
This was the 16th appearance of the event, having appeared at every Summer Games since 1960.

The reigning World Champions are Maryna Litvinchuk and Volha Khudzenka of Belarus. The reigning Olympic champions are Gabriella Szabó and Danuta Kozák of Hungary.

Qualification

A National Olympic Committee (NOC) could qualify one place in the event, though could enter up to 2 boats if it earned enough quota places through other women's kayak events. A total of 13 qualification places were available, initially allocated as follows:

 6 places awarded through the 2019 ICF Canoe Sprint World Championships
 3 places awarded to 3 different continents (excluding Europe) through the World Championships, which are then competed for at continental tournaments
 1 places awarded through a European continental tournament

Qualifying places were awarded to the NOC, not to the individual canoeist who earned the place.

The top 6 boats used only 5 of the 12 athlete quotas; the other 7 were reallocated up to the K-4. After the K-4 reallocation process, 3 spots were reallocated down to the K-2. This was sufficient to qualify China, using 2 of those places, but Austria could not qualify through reallocation because they needed 2 places and only 1 remained. The quota was reallocated further to the K-1 500 metres.

The three continental spots were awarded to Oceania (#9 New Zealand), the Americas (#13 Canada), and Africa (#19 South Africa); Asia had the lowest next-ranked team (#20 Uzbekistan). The continental tournaments were won by Tunisia, Germany, and Australia; the Americas spot was reallocated to the general World Championships after the tournament was cancelled. The World Championships spots were allocated as follows:

Continental places:

Nations with women's kayak quota spots from the K-1 200 metres, K-1 500 metres, or K-4 500 metres could enter (additional) boats as well.

Competition format
Sprint canoeing uses a four-round format for events with at least 11 boats, with heats, quarterfinals, semifinals, and finals. The specifics of the progression format depend on the number of boats ultimately entered.

The course is a flatwater course 9 metres wide. The name of the event describes the particular format within sprint canoeing. The "K" format means a kayak, with the canoeist sitting, using a double-bladed paddle to paddle, and steering with a foot-operated rudder (as opposed to a canoe, with a kneeling canoeist, single-bladed paddle, and no rudder). The "2" is the number of canoeists in each boat. The "500 metres" is the distance of each race.

Schedule
The event was held over two consecutive days, with two rounds per day. All sessions started at 9:30 a.m. local time, though there are multiple events with races in each session.

Results

Heats
Progression System: 1st-2nd to SF, rest to QF.

Heat 1

Heat 2

Heat 3

Heat 4

Quarterfinals
Progression: 1st-4th to SF, rest out.

Quarterfinal 1

Quarterfinal 2

Semifinals
Progression System: 1st-4th to Final A, rest to Final B.

Semifinal 1

Semifinal 2

Finals

Final A

Final B

References

Women's K-2 500 metres
Women's events at the 2020 Summer Olympics